The term kola nut usually refers to the seeds of certain species of plant of the genus Cola, placed formerly in the cocoa family Sterculiaceae and now usually subsumed in the mallow family Malvaceae (as subfamily Sterculioideae). These cola species are trees native to the tropical rainforests of Africa. Their caffeine-containing seeds are used as flavoring ingredients in beverages applied to various carbonated soft drinks, from which the name cola originates.

General description

The kola nut is a caffeine-containing nut of evergreen trees of the genus Cola, primarily of the species Cola acuminata and Cola nitida. Cola acuminata, an evergreen tree about 20 meters in height, has long, ovoid leaves pointed at both the ends with a leathery texture. The trees have cream flowers with purplish-brown striations, and star-shaped fruit consisting of usually 5 follicles. Inside each follicle, about a dozen prismatic seeds develop in a white seed-shell. The nut’s aroma is sweet and rose-like. The first taste is bitter, but it sweetens upon chewing. The nut can be boiled to extract the caffeine.

Kola nuts contain about 2–4% caffeine and theobromine, as well as tannins, alkaloids, saponins, and flavonoids.

Uses
The kola nut has a bitter flavor and contains caffeine. It is chewed in many West African countries, in both private and social settings. It is often used ceremonially, presented to chiefs or guests. In folk medicine, kola nuts are considered useful for aiding digestion when ground and mixed with honey, and are used as a remedy for coughs. Kola nuts are perhaps best known to Western culture as a flavoring ingredient and one of the sources of caffeine in cola and other similarly flavored beverages, although kola nut extract is no longer used in major commercial cola drinks such as Coca-Cola.

History
Human use of the kola nut, like the coffee berry and tea leaf, appears to have ancient origins. It is chewed in many West African cultures, in both private and social settings, as a source of mental stimulation. 

The spread of the kola nut across North Africa seems to be connected to the spread of Islam across North Africa during the 17th century, as trading across the Mediterranean became more concrete. The kola nut was particularly useful on slave ships to improve the taste of water, as enslaved Africans were often given poor quality water to drink.

Kola nuts are an important part of the traditional spiritual practice , culture, and religion in West Africa, particularly Niger, Nigeria, Sierra Leone and Liberia. The 1970s hit "Goro City", by Manu Dibango, highlights the significance of kola nuts (called "goro" in the Hausa language) to the capital of Niger, Niamey. Kola nuts are used as a religious object and sacred offering during prayers, ancestor veneration, and significant life events, such as naming ceremonies, weddings, and funerals. For this use, only kola nuts divided into four lobes are suitable. They are cast upon a special wooden board and the resulting patterns are read by a trained diviner. Among a few Yoruba people, it has found inroads among the Muslim population as well, in weddings and other ceremonies.

They were used as a form of currency in such West African groups as the Malinke and Bambara of Mali and Senegal.  They are still used as such today in certain situations such as in negotiation over bride prices or as a form of a respect or host gift to the elders of a village should one move to a village or enter a business arrangement with the village.

Cola recipe

In the 1880s, a pharmacist in Georgia, John Pemberton, took caffeine extracted from kola nuts and cocaine-containing extracts from coca leaves and mixed them with sugar, other flavorings, and carbonated water to invent Coca-Cola, the first massive cola soft drink. As of 2016, the cola recipe no longer contained actual kola nut extract.

Cultivation
Originally a tree of the tropical rainforest, it needs a hot humid climate, but can withstand a dry season on sites with a high ground water level. It may be cultivated in drier areas where groundwater is available. C. nitida is a shade bearer, but develops a better spreading crown which yields more fruits in open places. Though it is a lowland forest tree, it has been found at altitudes over 300 m on deep, rich soils under heavy and evenly distributed rainfall.

Regular weeding is necessary, which can be performed manually or through the use of herbicides. Some irrigation can be provided to the plants, but it is important to remove the water through an effective drainage system, as excess water may prove to be detrimental for the growth of the plant. When not grown in adequate shade, the kola nut plant responds well to fertilizers. Usually, the plants need to be provided with windbreaks to protect them from strong gales.

Kola nuts can be harvested mechanically or by hand, by plucking them at the tree branch. Nigeria produces 52.4% of worldwide production followed by the Ivory Coast and Cameroon. When kept in a cool, dry place, kola nuts can be stored for a long time.

Pests and diseases
The nuts are subject to attack by the kola weevil Balanogastris cola. The larvae of the moth Characoma strictigrapta that also attacks cacao bore into the nuts. Traders sometimes apply an extract of the bark of Rauvolfia vomitoria or the pulverised fruits of Xylopia and Capsicum to counteract the attack on nursery plants. The cacao pests Sahlbergella spp. have been found also on C. nitida as an alternative host plant. While seeds are liable to worm attack, the wood is subject to borer attack.

Major producers

Nigeria accounted for 55% of the kola nut production in 2020.

Chemical composition
Preliminary studies of phytochemicals in kola nut indicate the presence of various constituents:
 caffeine (2–3.5%)
 theobromine (1.0–2.5%)
 theophylline
 methylliberine
 polyphenols
 phlobaphens (kola red)
 epicatechin
 D-catechin
 tannic acid
 carbohydrate
 cellulose
 water

Society and culture

Used in cultural traditions of the Igbo people, the presentation of kola nuts to guests or in a traditional gathering shows good will.

A kola nut ceremony is briefly described in Chinua Achebe's 1958 novel Things Fall Apart. The eating of kola nuts is referred to at least a further ten times in the novel showing the significance of the kola nut in pre-colonial 1890s Igbo culture in Nigeria. One of these sayings on kola nut in Things Fall Apart is: "He who brings kola brings life." It is also featured prominently in Chris Abani's 2004 novel GraceLand. The kola nut is also mentioned in The Color Purple by Alice Walker, although it is spelled "cola".

The kola nut is mentioned in Bloc Party's song "Where is Home?" on the album A Weekend in the City. The lyric, setting a post-funeral scene for the murder of a black boy in London, reads, "After the funeral, breaking kola nuts, we sit and reminisce about the past." The kola nut is mentioned in the At the Drive-In song "Enfilade" on the album Relationship of Command. The kola nut is repeatedly mentioned in Chimamanda Ngozi Adichie's novel Half of a Yellow Sun, which also features the phrase: "He who brings the Kola nut brings life."

Gallery

References

External links
 Cola acuminata - (P.Beauv.) Schott & Endl., Plants For A Future, 2012
 The Rise and Fall of Cocaine Cola

Cola (plant)
Caffeine
Herbal and fungal stimulants
Edible nuts and seeds
Crops originating from Africa
Plants used in traditional African medicine